Alexandria Aquarium is a small aquarium in Alexandria, Egypt. It was built in 1930 and is near Qaitbay fort on Alexandria's Eastern Harbour. The aquarium exhibits many species from the Mediterranean and Red Sea around Egypt, as well as some freshwater species from the Nile and the Amazon. Animals on display range from fish to crustaceans and turtles (both marine and freshwater). The Aquarium is also home to the Marine Research Institute.

Aquaria in Egypt
Museums in Alexandria
Science museums in Egypt
Zoos established in 1930